Eugenio Amore (born February 12, 1972 in Vergato) is a beach volleyball player from Italy. 

He and team mate Riccardo Lione represented Italy at the 2008 Summer Olympics in Beijing, China.

External links
 Athlete bio at 2008 Olympics site

1972 births
Living people
Beach volleyball players at the 2008 Summer Olympics
Italian beach volleyball players
Olympic beach volleyball players of Italy